Jan Hanzlík (born March 21, 1982) is a Czech professional ice hockey player. He currently plays for BK Mladá Boleslav of the Czech Extraliga.

He previously played for HC Kometa Brno between 2013 and 2016 and HC Sparta Praha from 2003 to 2013.

References

External links

1982 births
Living people
Czech ice hockey defencemen
HC Kometa Brno players
HC Sparta Praha players
Sportspeople from Mladá Boleslav